The 1922 Campeonato Paulista, organized by the APEA (Associação Paulista de Esportes Atléticos), was the 21st season of São Paulo's top association football league. Corinthians won the title for the 3rd time. the top scorer was Corinthians's Gambarotta with 19 goals.

System
The championship was disputed in two stages:
First round: All clubs played each other in a single round-robin system. The eight best teams qualified to the Second round.
Second round: The remaining eight clubs played each other in a single round-robin system. The team with the most points in the sum of both rounds won the title.

Championship

First round

Second round

Final standings

References

Campeonato Paulista seasons
Paulista